The Southern Hemisphere Ornithological Congresses (SHOC) comprise a short-lived series of two ornithological conferences focussing on the avifauna of the world's southern continents, seas and islands.  Both conferences were held in Australia under the auspices of the Royal Australasian Ornithologists Union (RAOU), following which the series lapsed.  At least as far as Australia and New Zealand were concerned, the series was replaced by the ongoing biennial Australasian Ornithological Conference (AOC) series, instigated in 2001 by the RAOU and subsequently cosponsored by the Ornithological Society of New Zealand.

SHOC meetings
 1996 – Albany, Western Australia
 2000 – Brisbane, Queensland

References

Ornithological organisations in Australia
Organizations established in 1996
Ornithological conferences
1996 establishments in Australia